Fernand Gravey (25 December 1905 in Ixelles (Belgium) – 2 November 1970 in Paris, France), also known as Fernand Gravet in the United States, was the son of actors Georges Mertens and Fernande Depernay, who appeared in silent films produced by pioneer Belge Cinéma Film (a subsidiary of Pathé).

Early life 
Gravey started performing at age five under his father's direction.

Before World War I, he received an education in Britain and could speak both French and English fluently, something which became useful in his movie roles. During the war, Gravey served in the British Merchant Marine Corp.

In 1936, he married the French actress Jane Renouardt, who was 15 years his senior. They remained together until his death on 2 November 1970 of a heart-attack. Jane died on 3 February 1972. They had no children.

Film career 
Gravey performed in four films in 1913 and 1914 (as Fernand Mertens), but his first film of importance was L'Amour Chante, released in 1930. In 1933, he made Bitter Sweet, his first English language movie, which became more famous in its 1940 incarnation with Jeanette MacDonald and Nelson Eddy.

In 1937, after several more French and British movies, Gravey went to Hollywood, where the spelling of his last name was altered to Gravet, and he became the focus of a rather extensive Hollywood publicity campaign (instructing moviegoers to pronounce his name properly: "Rhymes with Gravy"). Unfortunately for Gravey, he was offered only standard parts, the type of Gallic-lover roles that Louis Jourdan played in the 1950s and 1960s.

The first two films he made in Hollywood were for Warner Brothers: The King and the Chorus Girl (1937), with Joan Blondell and Jane Wyman, and Fools for Scandal (1938), with Carole Lombard and Ralph Bellamy. Gravey then signed with Metro-Goldwyn-Mayer and was cast as Johann Strauss in the expensive biopic The Great Waltz, with Luise Rainer and Miliza Korjus.

MGM next planned to star Gravey in a film version of Rafael Sabatini's adventure novel Scaramouche, but instead he returned to France just before the Nazi occupation began. Although he had agreed to appear in German-approved French films, Gravey was an underminer of the invaders as a member of the French Secret Army and the Foreign Legion.

At the end of the war, Gravey was considered a war hero, and continued to be featured in French productions such as La Ronde (with Danielle Darrieux), and Royal Affairs in Versailles (1954). Among his last English language performances were How to Steal a Million (1966), Guns for San Sebastian (1968) and The Madwoman of Chaillot (1969), in which he played the police inspector.

Selected filmography 

 Loyalty (1914) - Jonge Jefke / Young Jefke
 Love Songs (1930) - Armand Petitjean
 Chérie (1930) - Burton
 Let's Get Married (1931) - Francis Latour
 The Man in Evening Clothes (1931) - André de Lussanges
 You Will Be a Duchess (1932) - Marquis André de la Cour
 Coiffeur pour dames (1932) - Mario
 Passionnément (1932) - Robert Perceval
 The Improvised Son (1932) - Fernand Brassart
 I by Day, You by Night (1932) - Albert
 A Star Disappears (1932) - Himself
 Bitter Sweet (1933) - Carl Linden
 The Premature Father (1933) - Édouard Puma & Fred
 Early to Bed (1933) - Carl
 Court Waltzes (1933) - Franz
 C'était un musicien (1933) - Jean
 The Queen's Affair (1934) - Carl
 Night in May (1934) - Le baron Neuhaus
 Si j'étais le patron (1934) - Henri Janvier
 Antonia (1935) - Le capitaine Douglas Parker
 Monsieur Sans-Gêne (1935) - Fernand Martin
 Variétés (1935) - Pierre
 Touche-à-Tout (1935) - Georges Martin dit Touche-à-Tout
 Fanfare of Love (1935) - Jean
 Seven Men, One Woman (1936) - Brémontier
 Le Grand Refrain (1936) - Charles Panard - un compositeur de talent
 Compliments of Mister Flow (1936) - Antonin Rose
 The King and the Chorus Girl (1937) - Alfred Bruger VII
 The Lie of Nina Petrovna (1937) - Lieutenant Franz Korff
 Fools for Scandal (1938) - Rene Vilardell
 The Great Waltz (1938) - Johann Strauss
 Le Dernier Tournant (1939) - Frank Maurice
 Paradise Lost (1940) - Le peintre Pierre Leblanc
 Histoire de rire (1941) - Gérard Barbier
 Romance à trois (1942) - Charles
 La nuit fantastique (1942) - Denis
 Captain Fracasse (1943) - Le baron de Cigognac / Il barone di Sigognac
 Domino (1943) - Dominique
 La Rabouilleuse (1944) - Colonel Philippe Brideau
 Pamela (1945) - Paul Barras
 Once Is Enough (1946) - Jacques Reval
 Captain Blomet (1947) - Blomet
 Du Guesclin (1949) - Bertrand du Guesclin
 La Ronde (1950) - Charles Breitkopf, Emma's Husband
 Mademoiselle Josette, My Woman (1950) - André Ternay
 Gunman in the Streets (1950) - Commissioner Dufresne
 My Wife Is Formidable (1951) - Raymond Corbier
 Le plus heureux des hommes (1952) - Armand Dupuis-Martin
 My Husband Is Marvelous (1952) - Claude Chatel
 Too Young for Love (1953) - Padre di Andrea, presidente del tribunale
 Royal Affairs in Versailles (1954) - Molière
 Thirteen at the Table (1955) - Antoine Villardier
 Short Head (1956) - Olivier Parker
 Mitsou ou Comment l'esprit vient aux filles (1956) - Pierre Duroy-Lelong
 La garçonne (1957) - Georges Sauvage
 Le Temps des œufs durs (1958) - Raoul Gandvivier
 School for Coquettes (1958) - Stanislas de La Ferronière
 Toto in Paris (1958) - Il dottor Duclos
 Les croulants se portent bien (1961) - François Legrand
 Girl on the Road (1962) - L'homme à la cadillac
 La Dama de Beirut (1965) - Dr. Castello
 How to Steal a Million (1966) - Grammont
 Guns for San Sebastian (1968) - Governor
 The Madwoman of Chaillot (1969) - Police Sergeant
 Les Caprices de Marie (1970) - Le capitaine Ragot
 Promise at Dawn (1970) - Jean-Michel Serusier
 L'Explosion (1971) - Labrize

References

Bibliography
 John Holmstrom, The Moving Picture Boy: An International Encyclopaedia from 1895 to 1995, Norwich, Michael Russell, 1996, pp. 23-24.

External links
  French National Library
  Les gens du cinéma

1905 births
1970 deaths
French male film actors
Belgian male film actors
People from Ixelles
20th-century French male actors
Belgian emigrants to France
French expatriate male actors in the United States